The Turtle Creek Casino and Hotel is located in Williamsburg, Michigan.  The Grand Traverse Band of Ottawa and Chippewa Indians own the casino and resort. Turtle Creek Casino and Hotel is the land-based partner of Caesars Online Casino (William Hill) in Michigan.

References

Casinos in Michigan
Buildings and structures in Grand Traverse County, Michigan
Hotels in Michigan
Native American casinos
Tourist attractions in Grand Traverse County, Michigan
Casino hotels
Native American history of Michigan